Sam Royle (born 12 February 2000) is a professional rugby league footballer who plays as a  forward for St Helens.

He signed with the St Helens academy from Thatto Heath Crusaders RFC at the age of 11. He won the St Helens Under-19's Academy Player of the Year in 2019.

References

External links
St Helens profile

2000 births
Living people
English rugby league players
Hull Kingston Rovers players
Rugby league players from St Helens, Merseyside
Rugby league second-rows
St Helens R.F.C. players